Racks railway station was a railway station in Dumfries and Galloway, Scotland, south of Dumfries, OS NGR NY 033 743, serving and effectively creating the village of Racks near the Lochar Water, 4 miles ESE of Dumfries; a rural community within the Parish of Torthorwald.

History 
The station, 62.64 miles south of Glasgow Saint Enoch station, opened in July 1848. The station is now closed, although the line running through the station remains open. The station building has been converted into a private dwelling. The difference in height between the main building and platform level was overcome by the use of two fenced diagonal ramps built into the slope with the remainder of the area occupied by a profusion of shrubbery and flower beds.

Racks was opened by the Glasgow, Dumfries and Carlisle Railway, which then became part of the Glasgow and South Western Railway; in 1923 it became part of the London Midland and Scottish Railway at the Grouping, passing on to the Scottish Region of British Railways following the 1948 nationalisation of the railways. It had been a 'Wednesday Only' since 1860 before becoming a fully open station on 2 January 1865. It was closed by the British Railways Board under the Beeching Axe in 1965.

Services

Views of Racks in 2010

References

Sources

External links
 Railscot website
 Railscot Intranet
 Racks on Geograph

Disused railway stations in Dumfries and Galloway
Railway stations in Great Britain opened in 1848
Railway stations in Great Britain closed in 1965
Beeching closures in Scotland
Former Glasgow and South Western Railway stations
1848 establishments in Scotland
1965 disestablishments in Scotland